Darran Rowbotham (born 22 October 1966) is a Welsh former footballer who made more than 450 appearances in the Football League playing as a striker.

Career
Rowbotham was born in Cardiff, Wales. He began his career as a junior with Plymouth Argyle, and turned professional with the club in November 1984. Three years later he joined local rivals Exeter City. A key player in Exeter winning the Fourth Division title in the 1989–90 season, his goalscoring had linked him with possible moves to top-flight football. However, he sustained a serious knee injury which kept him out of football for a year, after which his career was restricted to the lower divisions of the Football League.

After four years at Exeter, where he scored 58 goals in 142 games in all competitions, he joined Torquay United for a fee of £25,000. Only four months later he moved on again, following his former Exeter manager Terry Cooper to Birmingham City for a fee of £20,000.

Lack of goals for Birmingham resulted in loan spells at Mansfield Town and Hereford United before he left on a free transfer, signing for Crewe Alexandra before the 1993–94 season. He spent two years there, followed by an 18-month spell at Shrewsbury Town, before returning to Exeter in 1996. He remained at Exeter for four years, including a month on loan to Leyton Orient, before being released at the end of the 1999–2000 season. He ended his career playing alongside brother Jason for Weymouth in the Southern League.

Honours
Individual
PFA Team of the Year: 1989–90 Fourth Division

References
General

Specific

External links

1966 births
Living people
Footballers from Cardiff
Welsh footballers
Association football forwards
Plymouth Argyle F.C. players
Exeter City F.C. players
Torquay United F.C. players
Birmingham City F.C. players
Mansfield Town F.C. players
Hereford United F.C. players
Crewe Alexandra F.C. players
Shrewsbury Town F.C. players
Leyton Orient F.C. players
Weymouth F.C. players
English Football League players